Zayatskoye is a rural locality (a settlement) in Semizerye Rural Settlement, Kaduysky District, Vologda Oblast, Russia. The population was 23 as of 2002.

Geography 
Zayatskoye is located 69 km northwest of Kaduy (the district's administrative centre) by road. Starostino is the nearest rural locality.

References 

Rural localities in Kaduysky District